KDE e.V. is a registered non-profit organization that represents the KDE community in the legal and financial entities. The association supports KDE’s work in cash, hardware, and other donations, and then the use of donations to help the KDE development, but not influence on development. "e.V." stands for "eingetragener Verein" which means "registered association". The three flags on top of the KDE e.V. logo represent the three main tasks of the KDE e.V.: supporting the community, representing the community, and governing the community.

History 
In August 1997, KDE One was held in Arnsberg, Germany. It's the first KDE community meeting with 15 participants, and budget is 14000 DEM (7158 EUR). Matthias Kalle Dalheimer realized that it wasn't a good idea to channel thousands of money through his personal account to run the meeting, so he wanted to find an association. In November 1997, Matthias Ettrich and Matthias Kalle Dalheimer registered KDE e.V.  as association in Tübingen under German law, and became president and vice president. Additionally they had to reach out to housemates and personal friends to meet the minimum number of persons required to create an eingetragener Verein (7 persons).

In October 1999, the following candidates were elected to the board in KDE Two, Kurt Granroth became president, Chris Schläger became vice president, Mirko Boehm became treasurer, and Preston Brown became board member. In August 2002, the following candidates were elected to the board in KDE e.V. meeting, Matthias Kalle Dalheimer became president, Mirko Boehm became treasurer, and Eva Brucherseifer and Ralf Nolden became board member.

On 26 August 2005, the following candidates were elected to the board in KDE e.V. meeting, president was Eva Brucherseifer, vice president was Cornelius Schumacher, treasurer was Mirko Boehm, and board member was Aaron Seigo. On 15 October 2006, Mark Shuttleworth had become the first Patron of KDE. On 28 February 2007, Trolltech become the first corporate Patron of KDE.

On 2 July 2007, the following candidates were elected to the board in KDE e.V. meeting, president was Aaron Seigo, vice president were Cornelius Schumacher and Adriaan de Groot, and board member were Sebastian Kügler and Klaas Freitag. On 3 July 2007, KDAB becomes Patron of KDE. On 7 July 2007, Intel Corporation and Novell had also become Patron of KDE. On 4 April 2008, the KDE e.V. and Wikimedia Deutschland have opened shared offices in Frankfurt, and has the first KDE e.V. employee.

In July 2009, the following candidates were elected to the board in KDE e.V. meeting, Cornelius Schumacher became president, Adriaan de Groot and Frank Karlitschek became vice president, and Sebastian Kügler and Celeste Lyn Paul became board member. In September 2009, KDE e.V. and Free Software Foundation Europe (FSFE) moved into shared offices in Berlin. In January 2010, Google becomes supporting member. On 9 June 2010, KDE e.V. launched the "Join the Game" campaign. It promotes the idea of becoming a supporting member for individuals. It is made available for those who would like to support KDE, but do not have enough time to do so. Georg Greve, founder of the Free Software Foundation Europe (FSFE) was first to 'join the game'.

Organization 

KDE e.V. includes three types of memberships: Active members, Extraordinary members and Supporting Members. Both natural persons and legal bodies may become members. The Active members have contributed to KDE community. The supporting members are supporting the KDE through financial contributions, consist of: basysKom GmbH, Digia, Sirius Corporation Ltd, and Google. The Patron of KDE is the highest level of supporting member, are: SUSE, Klarälvdalens Datakonsult AB, and Nokia. All association’s members are invited to attend the general assembly. The general assembly is often as part of Akademy.

The board of directors are responsible for the operation of the association. The board of directors has five members via election held by general assembly. KDE e.V. office is located in Berlin. It has 1 paid administrative employee, called business manager. The business manager is full-time responsible for daily operations, resource acquisition and managing interns. KDE e.V. offers internships to qualified students. In Spain, the official representative of KDE e.V. is KDE España. KDE e.V. is an associate organization of the FSFE and a licensee of the Open Invention Network.

Activities 
KDE e.V. organizes and subsidizes events including  developer sprints, Camp KDE and Akademy. It handles the legal issues around the KDE community.

The working groups are a structure which will formalize some roles within KDE and enhance coordination within KDE, communication between parts of KDE. Currently, active working groups are community working group (CWG), marketing working group (MWG) and system administration (sysadmin). Disbanded working groups are human computer interaction working group (HCI WG) and technical working group (TWG).

The System Administration Working Group is responsible for administration of KDE servers. The Marketing Working Group was founded in November 2005, help to coordination of marketing and promotion. Currently members are Troy Unrau, Franz Keferböck and Wade Olson. The Community Working Group was founded in August 2008, helps with community advice when needed.

The Technical Working Group is to coordinate planning and release. Furthermore, they should decide what software is included in KDE or removed, as different programs will be combined into modules and the dependencies between the modules and to external software should be allowed. A further task, it is a contact point for general technical questions related to KDE to be contacts between developers of the project and produce. After one year, the Technical Working Group has been replaced by the Release team, that is independent of KDE e.V..

References 

Free software project foundations
KDE
Non-profit organisations based in Berlin